New Philharmonia may refer to:
the 1964-1977 incarnation of the Philharmonia Orchestra
the New Philharmonia Orchestra of Massachusetts